Hyaloctoides sokotrensis is a species of tephritid or fruit flies in the genus Hyaloctoides of the family Tephritidae.

Distribution
Yemen.

References

Tephritinae
Insects described in 1939
Diptera of Asia